The NASA Launch Services Program (LSP) is responsible for procurement of launch services for NASA uncrewed missions and  oversight of launch integration and launch preparation activity, providing added quality and mission assurance to meet program objectives. LSP operates under the NASA Space Operations Mission Directorate (SOMD).

Since 1990, NASA has purchased expendable launch vehicle launch services directly from commercial providers, whenever possible, for its scientific and applications missions. Expendable launch vehicles can accommodate all types of orbit inclinations and altitudes and are ideal vehicles for launching Earth-orbit and interplanetary missions. The Launch Services Program was established at Kennedy Space Center for NASA's acquisition and program management of expendable launch vehicle missions. A NASA/contractor team is in place to meet the mission of the Launch Services Program, which exists to provide leadership, expertise and cost-effective services in the commercial arena to satisfy Agency wide space transportation requirements and maximize the opportunity for mission success.

Primary launch sites are Cape Canaveral Space Force Station (CCSFS) in Florida, and Vandenberg Space Force Base (VSFB) in California. Other launch locations are NASA's Wallops Flight Facility in Virginia, Reagan Test Site at Kwajalein Atoll in the Republic of the Marshall Islands, and Kodiak Launch Complex in Alaska.

History

Operations

NASA Launch Services II 
The LSP acquires space launch services using the NASA Launch Services (NLS) II Contract. Once a year, launch services contractors can be added to or offloaded from contract. The following contractors are attached to the NLS II Contract.
 Northrop Grumman – Antares
 United Launch Alliance (ULA) – Atlas V
 United Launch Alliance (ULA) – Delta IV Heavy
 SpaceX – Falcon 9
 SpaceX – Falcon Heavy
 Northrop Grumman – Pegasus XL
 Northrop Grumman – Minotaur-C
 United Launch Alliance (ULA) – Vulcan Centaur
 Blue Origin – New Glenn

Venture-Class Acquisition of Dedicated and Rideshare missions 
In January 2022, NASA awarded contracts to 12 launch services contractors to support Venture-Class Acquisition of Dedicated and Rideshare (VADR) missions. The contractors selected are:
 ABL Space Systems of El Segundo, California
 Astra Space Inc. of Alameda, California
 Blue Origin Florida LLC of Merritt Island, Florida
 L2 Solutions LLC of Houston, Texas
 Northrop Grumman Systems Corporation of Chandler, Arizona
 Phantom Space Corporation of Tucson, Arizona
 Relativity Space Inc. of Long Beach, California
 Rocket Lab USA Inc. of Long Beach, California
 Spaceflight Inc. of Seattle, Washington
 Space Exploration Technologies Corp. (SpaceX) of Hawthorne, California
 United Launch Alliance LLC of Centennial, Colorado
 Virgin Orbit LLC of Long Beach, California

Partnered with spacecraft customers
The LSP works with U.S. Government spacecraft program offices to define launch requirements for their programs and then engage with launch services contractors to deliver a compatible solution. LSP has relationships with various agencies and organizations:
Applied Physics Laboratory in Laurel, Maryland
Jet Propulsion Laboratory, located at the California Institute of Technology
NASA's Ames Research Center at Moffett Field, in California's Silicon Valley
NASA's Goddard Space Flight Center in Greenbelt, Maryland
NASA Langley Research Center in Hampton, Virginia
NASA Marshall Space Flight Center at Redstone Arsenal in Huntsville, Alabama
Several U.S. Universities, launching small research satellites (CubeSats)
International partners
Other Government Agencies:
Missile Defense Agency (MDA)
National Oceanic and Atmospheric Administration (NOAA)
National Reconnaissance Office (NRO)

Collaboration with U.S. Space Force 
LSP also works with the United States Space Force (USSF), via coordination by the launch services contractors. For launches at Cape Canaveral Space Force Station (CCSFS) and Vandenberg Space Force Base (VSFB), the Space Launch Delta 45 and Space Launch Delta 30 commanders, respectively, are the Launch Decision Authority.

For launches from CCSFS, guardians, Space Force civilians and contractors from throughout Space Launch Delta 45 provided vital support, including weather forecasts, launch and range operations, security, safety, medical and public affairs. The wing also provided its vast network of radar, telemetry, and communications instrumentation to facilitate a safe launch on the Eastern Range. Among work done by the Space Force is Mission Flight Control, which ensures public safety during launch.

Operating locations 
The LSP management, business office, and engineering teams support from the Operations and Checkout Building at Kennedy Space Center.
The Launch Services Program operates Hangar AE on the Cape Canaveral Space Force Station. It is LSP's Launch Communications Center. For Florida launches, many of the primary LSP engineers on console are in Hangar AE. For launches from California and other launch sites, many of support LSP engineers are on console there. Launch services contractors and spacecraft engineers will often operate out of the Hangar also. It gathers telemetry for rocket launches beyond those worked by LSP.

LSP also maintains resident offices at:
 Vandenberg Space Force Base (California)
 United Launch Alliance (Centennial, CO and Decatur, Alabama)
 Orbital Sciences (Dulles, VA and Chandler, Arizona)
 SpaceX (Hawthorne, CA)

Mission risk posture and launch services selection 
NASA has specific policies governing launch services. NASA uses a certification system for rockets launched by its contractors, and for validation purposes it requires the certification process to be "instrumented to provide design verification and flight performance data", with post-flight operations, anomaly resolution process, and a flight margin verification process, with 80% predicted design reliability at 95% confidence.

Additional advisory services
In addition to providing end-to-end launch services, LSP also offers Advisory Services. This "is a consulting service to government and commercial organizations, providing mission management, overall systems engineering and/or specific discipline expertise; e.g. mission assurance, flight design, systems safety, etc., as requested." By example, the LSP Flight Design team provides general information regarding the launch vehicle performance available via existing NASA contracts. This non-traditional service allows LSP to "expand its customer base and assist these customers in maximizing their mission success by using NASA LSP's unique expertise." The four general categories of advisory services are:
 SMART (Supplemental Mission Advisory and Risk Team)
 Design and Development
 Independent Verification and Validation (IV&V)
 Independent Review Teams (IRT)
 Spacecraft naming

Upcoming launches 
The schedule below includes only Launch Services Program (LSP) primary and advisory missions. The NASA Launch Schedule has the most up to date public schedule of all NASA launches. The NASA Kennedy News Releases will also have updates on LSP launches and mission accomplishments. Additional NASA pages which mention future launch dates are the Launch Services Education Program, NASA Goddard's Explorers Program, and NASA Goddard's Upcoming Planetary Events and Missions.

The ELaNa Launch Schedule has the upcoming schedule of CubeSat missions, which occur on both NASA and non-NASA launches.

Research

Technical subject matter expertise 
The Launch Services Program team also performs research relating to launching uncrewed NASA spacecraft. Research and technical analysis topics include:

 Flight Design analysts work on the intended course, or trajectory, of the rocket.
 Telemetry engineers get tracking stations to cover all the mandatory portions of flight. Analysts from many disciplines review this data post-flight.
 Weather Forecasters Balance Experience with Technology
 The Failure Analysis and Materials Evaluation Lab assists the program by examining failures and figuring out what went wrong 
 Collision Avoidance (COLA)
 Upper-level Winds on Day-of-Launch; collaborations with groups such as the NASA Kennedy Space Center Applied Meteorology Unit (AMU) and Space Launch Delta 45.
 Slosh Fluid Dynamics

Slosh fluid dynamics experiments 

SPHERES-Slosh will be performed on the SPHERES Testbed on the International Space Station. The experiment launched on the Cygnus capsule going to the ISS via Orbital Sciences Corporation Commercial Resupply Services Orb-1 mission on an Antares on 2014.01.09. The Cygnus arrived at the ISS on 2014.01.12 and will spend five weeks unloading the cargo.

The SPHERES-Slosh investigation uses small robotic satellites on the International Space Station to examine how liquids move around inside containers in microgravity. A water bottle's contents slosh around differently in space than on Earth, but the physics of liquid motion in microgravity are not well understood, which affects computer simulations of liquid rocket fuel behavior. LSP leads a team that includes Florida Institute of Technology  and Massachusetts Institute of Technology. The research is sponsored by the Game Changing Development (GCD) program (within NASA Technology Demonstration Office (TDO)'s Space Technology Mission Directorate).
 

The experiment is a water tank with cameras and sensors that will be mounted between two SPHERES satellites inside the ISS. During testing, the SPHERES will move to purposely agitate the water and cause the fluid inside to slosh around, like it might in a rocket or spacecraft tank during flight. The data collected will be one of a kind. Three initial tests are expected to happen with the first couple months of launch.

"The current inability to accurately predict fuel and oxidizer behavior can result in unnecessary caution, requiring extra propellant to be added along with additional helium for tank pressurization. A better understanding of fluid slosh could not only decrease this uncertainty, but increase efficiency, reduce costs and allow additional payloads to be launched." Understanding from this experiment could help improve design/operations of rocket tanks and control systems.

NASA's Brandon Marsell, co-principal investigator on the Slosh Project: "Modern computer models try to predict how liquid moves inside a propellant tank. Now that rockets are bigger and are going farther, we need more precise data. Most of the models we have were validated under 1 g conditions on Earth. None have been validated in the surface tension-dominated microgravity environment of space." (via Langley Research Center article)

Slosh is the first project on the ISS to use 3D printed materials for its experiment. NASA's Jacob Roth, project manager on the Slosh Project, on the first science session: "The results from our first checkout run are proving interesting. While not too unexpected, the bubble/liquid interaction behavior appears to be exhibiting a slightly different interaction than current models predict." The team will be altering the tests for the second session based on the preliminary results.

Videos
Space Station Live: Fluid Motion Study Using Mini-Satellites - Reel NASA Interview with LSP's Dr. Paul Schallhorn to explain the experiment
Space to Ground - 1/17/14 - Reel NASA update on ISS includes launch of SPHERES-Slosh

The 2008-2010 slosh related tests on SPHERES were performed with a single SPHERES spacecraft and, in some cases, the addition of a battery pack Velcroed on to the SPHERES spacecraft. These tests were to better understand the physical properties of the SPHERES spacecraft, notably the mass properties, prior adding any tanks to the system. Some of the tests also attempted to excite and then sense slosh within the SPHERES  tank. Florida Tech designed the slosh experiments for Test Sessions 18/20/24/25.

Cryogenic orbital testbed 
The Cryogenic Orbital Testbed (CRYOTE) is a collaboration between NASA and commercial companies to develop an orbital testbed that will demonstrate cryogenic fluid management technologies in space environments. "The testbed provides an in-space environment in which the fluid transfer, handling, and storage of liquid hydrogen (LH2) and/or liquid oxygen (LO2) can be demonstrated."

The research is funded by the NASA Innovative Partnership Program (IPP) in the Office of the Chief Technologist. "The partners involved in the development of this system include United Launch Alliance (ULA), Sierra Lobo, Innovative Engineering Solutions (IES), Yetispace, and NASA Glenn Research Center, Kennedy Space Center, and Marshall Space Flight Center."

Outreach

Educational outreach 
NASA's Launch Services Program Educational Outreach provides awareness to students, teachers and the public about NASA's exciting spacecraft missions and how the world benefits from them. Distance learning via video conference connects students to LSP experts

The office also coordinates activities and educational booths at events for NASA and the public. The outreach is performed by both members of the LSP Educational Outreach Office and LSP experts throughout the program.

The LSP Educational Outreach Office created the Rocket Science 101 Game. Students can pick a NASA mission, select the right rocket, and build a rocket to send the spacecraft into orbit. There are three different levels for varying ages and it is available for the computer and Apple/Android devices.

CubeSat Launch Initiative and Educational Launch of Nanosatellites 

NASA and the Launch Services Program are partnering with several universities to launch small research satellites. These small satellites are called CubeSats. The CubeSat Launch Initiative (CSLI) provides opportunities for small satellite payloads to fly on rockets planned for upcoming launches. As of February 2015, CSLI has selected 119 spacecraft since 2010.

The Educational Launch of Nanosatellites (ELaNa) program is a part of CSLI. ELaNa manifests the CubeSats selected by CSLI onto upcoming rocket launches. CubeSats were first included on the launch of LSP missions in 2011. ELaNa missions are not manifested exclusively on LSP missions; they have been a part of NRO/military launches and ELaNa V will be on an International Space Station resupply launch. ELaNa mission numbers are based on the order they are manifested; due to the nature of launching, the actual launch order differs from the mission numbers.

In 2014, as a part of the White House Maker Initiative, CSLI announced its intention to launch 50 small satellites from 50 states within five years. As of July 2014, there were 21 "rookie states" that had not previously been selected by the CSLI

In October 2015, NASA's LSP, with funding partnered by Earth Science Division of NASA's Science Mission Directorate, "awarded multiple Venture Class Launch Services (VCLS) contracts to provide small satellites (SmallSats) -- also called CubeSats, microsats or nanosatellites -- access to low-Earth orbit." Three companies received $4–7 million firm fixed-price contracts. The intention of the VCLS contracts is to provide alternatives to the current rideshare-type approach for launch of small satellites.

Community Involvement 
STEM teams are sponsored and mentored by NASA's Launch Services Program.

FIRST Robotics: Team 1592 - Bionic Tigers 
FIRST Robotics Competition Team 1592 (the Bionic Tigers) is out of Cocoa High School (CHS) and Holy Trinity Episcopal Academy. The founding mentors of the team were Analex contractors working for LSP; the team has had NASA LSP engineering mentors ever since 2006.

Merritt Island High School StangSat 
Merritt Island High School, in partnership with California Polytechnic State University, has a team building a CubeSat as part of Kennedy Space Center's Creating Understanding and Broadening Education through Satellite (CUBES) pilot project. The team's StangSat was accepted by the CubeSat Launch Initiative and launched 25 June 2019 as part of ELaNa XV, via the Space Test Program, on a SpaceX Falcon Heavy rocket.

The satellite, named StangSat after the school's Mustang mascot, will collect data on the amount of shock and vibration experienced by payloads while in orbit.,

On June 15, 2013, the team launched an engineering unit of StangSat on the Prospector-18 rocket; the suborbital flight took off from the Friends of Amateur Rocketry site in California's Mojave Desert. The other satellites on board were Rocket University Broad Initiatives CubeSat, or RUBICS-1 (KSC); PhoneSat (ARC); and CP-9 (CalPoly). Though the parachute deployed early, resulting in a hard landing, all four satellites were able to collect usable data.

The team will be only the second high school to launch a satellite into orbit, after Thomas Jefferson High School for Science and Technology's TJ3Sat in November 2013 (another ELaNa mission).

Social media 
NASA's Launch Services Program maintains social media accounts on Facebook and Twitter. NASA Kennedy Space Center social media accounts frequently post news involving LSP activities.

NASA has compiled a page will all its flagship social media accounts across many different platforms. The spacecraft section of this page has accounts for many of the spacecraft launched by NASA LSP.

NASA Public Affairs posts pictures and videos of NASA LSP spacecraft and rockets as they go through processing and launch.

A launch blog is also stood up for each launch campaign and is always updated on launch day by Kennedy Space Center Public Affairs.

Since NASA Socials were started in 2009, NASA LSP has participated in many for the launch of its missions: Juno, GRAIL, NPP, MSL, KSC 50th/MSL Landing, RBSP, MAVEN and more. NASA Socials allow social media followers to receive VIP access to NASA facilities and speakers. The participants post about their experiences with NASA, performing outreach to their networks. NASA LSP has provided speakers for these events, along with tour guides and other support. NASA Socials were formerly known as Tweetups.

NASA has created many apps, some of which feature NASA LSP and its spacecraft. One popular app is Spacecraft 3D, which features several spacecraft launched by LSP. Developed by JPL, the app allows uses to take 3D tours of many JPL spacecraft using a printed piece of paper and their phone or tablet. Users can rotate and zoom in on the spacecraft, along with deploying movable parts of the spacecraft such as solar arrays, masts, and booms. By deploying and retracting these parts, a user can get a sense of how the spacecraft goes from the launch configuration on top of the rocket to operation configuration when it's collecting scientific data.

See also 

 Commercial Spaceflight Federation
 List of Launch Services Program launches
 Spacecraft Assembly and Checkout Building

References

External links 
 Kennedy Resource Encyclopedia (includes some of the Technical Capabilities and Services and Facilities associated with LSP)
 SPHERES-Slosh Experiment
 CubeSat Launch Initiative (CSLI)
 Explorers Program

NASA oversight
NASA programs